"What's New Pussycat?" is the theme song for the eponymous movie, written by Burt Bacharach and Hal David, and sung by Welsh singer Tom Jones.  The original single included a 13-second instrumental introduction, ending in the sound of shattering glass, but later issues omitted this introduction.

Jones was skeptical about the song when first approached about it. He said when it was offered to him, he felt it was "sort of a backhanded compliment: 'I've got to have you, but this is the song.'" Jones said it took convincing from Bacharach to perform it:

Chart performance
It was Jones' third UK top 30 record, and peaked at number 11.  In the US, "What's New Pussycat?" peaked at number 3, and was Jones' second entry on the top 40.

Accolades
It was nominated for the Academy Award for Best Original Song in 1966, and lost to "The Shadow of Your Smile".

In popular culture and cover versions
It has also been performed by: 
Bobby Darin
Steve Lawrence
Stefán Karl Stefánsson
Anita Kerr 
The Wailers
The Four Seasons 
Barbra Streisand performed several lines in her "Color Me Barbra Medley" from the TV special and album Color Me Barbra.
The song was covered by Alvin and the Chipmunks in their 1965 album Chipmunks à Go-Go. 
It has also been referenced in John Mulaney’s popular segment “The Salt and Pepper Diner,” the last segment in his stand up routine The Top Part.
Wendy Carlos recorded a version performed with a moog synthesizer on her album By Request (1975). This version features cat's meow voices imitated with a synthesizer.
A metal version of the song was recorded by Leo Moracchioli for his YouTube channel, Frog Leap Studios.
The song was also used in the episode Husbands and Knives of The Simpsons where Milo (voiced by Jack Black) plays the Korean-language version.
In a Shining Time Station 1995 family special: "Once Upon a Time", a rat group called "The Rat Pack" performs this song while taking over The Jukebox Band's place.
In Cats & Dogs, the song appeared in the credits.
In Flushed Away, the song appeared in the credits.
In Madagascar 3: Europe's Most Wanted, in the casino in Monte Carlo, Alex lifts up the disguise of the King of Versailles to reveal the chimps and the penguins. Mason covers himself saying, "What's new, pussycat?", and Skipper says, surprised, "Whoa, Whoa, Whoa."
In Turbo, the song played on Turbo's music shell while moving in the grass.
Carole Baskin performed the song in Episode 2 of the 29th season of Dancing with the Stars.

References

Barbra Streisand songs
Tom Jones (singer) songs
1965 songs
1965 singles
Film theme songs
Songs written for films
Songs with music by Burt Bacharach
Songs with lyrics by Hal David
RPM Top Singles number-one singles
Decca Records singles
Song recordings produced by Peter Sullivan (record producer)